Menahga is a city in Wadena County in the U.S. state of Minnesota The population was 1,306 at the 2010 census.

History
Menahga was platted in 1891, and named for an Ojibwe language word meaning "there are [many] blueberries". A post office has been in operation at Menahga since 1891.

Geography

The Blueberry River flows just north of the city.

U.S. Route 71 and Minnesota State Highway 87 are two of the city's main routes.

Demographics

2010 census
As of the census of 2010, there were 1,306 people, 569 households, and 301 families living in the city. The racial makeup of the city was 97.8% White, 0.5% African American, 0.6% Native American, 0.2% Asian, 0.3% from other races, and 0.7% from two or more races. Hispanic or Latino of any race were 1.1% of the population.

There were 569 households, of which 25.0% had children under the age of 18 living with them, 39.5% were married couples living together, 8.3% had a female householder with no husband present, 5.1% had a male householder with no wife present, and 47.1% were non-families. 42.0% of all households were made up of individuals, and 24.7% had someone living alone who was 65 years of age or older. The average household size was 2.18 and the average family size was 3.01.

The median age in the city was 44.8 years. 24.3% of residents were under the age of 18; 6.2% were between the ages of 18 and 24; 19.8% were from 25 to 44; 21.7% were from 45 to 64; and 28.2% were 65 years of age or older. The gender makeup of the city was 45.9% male and 54.1% female.

2000 census
As of the census of 2000, there were 1,220 people, 491 households, and 282 families living in the city. The racial makeup of the city was 98.36% White, 0.08% African American, 0.98% Native American, 0.08% Asian, 0.08% from other races, and 0.41% from two or more races. Hispanic or Latino of any race were 0.33% of the population. 42.4% were of Finnish, 23.2% German and 15.5% Norwegian ancestry.

There were 491 households, out of which 25.9% had children under the age of 18 living with them, 45.0% were married couples living together, 9.4% had a female householder with no husband present, and 42.4% were non-families. 37.7% of all households were made up of individuals, and 20.6% had someone living alone who was 65 years of age or older.  The average household size was 2.22 and the average family size was 2.98.

In the city, the population was spread out, with 23.8% under the age of 18, 5.6% from 18 to 24, 20.2% from 25 to 44, 17.4% from 45 to 64, and 33.1% who were 65 years of age or older.  The median age was 46 years. For every 100 females, there were 81.8 males.  For every 100 females age 18 and over, there were 78.5 males.

The median income for a household in the city was $22,232, and the median income for a family was $30,288. Males had a median income of $26,071 versus $18,594 for females. The per capita income for the city was $14,360.  About 14.7% of families and 18.7% of the population were below the poverty line, including 22.6% of those under age 18 and 12.3% of those age 65 or over.

Notable residents
The writer-illustrator Wallace Wood, best known as one of the original five Mad cartoonists, was born in Menahga on June 17, 1927. Bhob Stewart documented Wood's Menahga childhood in the illustrated biography Against the Grain: Mad Artist Wallace Wood (TwoMorrows Publishing, 2003).

College basketball head coach Don Monson was born in Menahga in 1933; he moved to Idaho as 

Joseph Andrew Quinn, politician and lawyer was born in Menahga.

Tourist attractions

Menahga is known for the legend of the fictional St. Urho, the legendary patron saint of Finland, which led locals to celebrate St. Urho's Day on March 16, the day before St. Patrick's Day. A statue of St. Urho is along Highway 71 South.

Radio stations
FM radio
89.3  KOPJ Life Talk Radio
92.5 KXKK 92.5 Hot Country
94.5 KDLB Adult Contemporary The Arrow 94.7
97.5  KDKK 97.5 Music of Your Life
101.9 KQKK KQ102

AM radio
870  KPRM Classic Country News/Talk
1070 KSKK Country, 10,000 Watts
1570 KAKK Oldies 1570, 10,000 Watts

References

External links
 City website
 City data for Menahga

Cities in Minnesota
Cities in Wadena County, Minnesota